Rumble is a Mexican action film directed by R. Ellis Frazier, written by Benjamin Budd, and starring Gary Daniels, Sissi Fleitas, Eddie J. Fernandez, and Justin Nesbitt. The film marks the third collaboration between Daniels and Frazier; the second being Misfire in 2014 and the first being Across the Line: The Exodus of Charlie Wright in 2010.

Premise 
David Goran - an aging, former MMA fighter - is forced back into the ring when his girlfriend is kidnapped by a Mexican cartel leader.

Cast 
 Gary Daniels as David Goran
 Sissi Fleitas as Eva
 Eddie J. Fernandez as Rampage
 Justin Nesbitt as Marty
 John Solis as Concierge
 Luis Gatica as Agent Fonseca
 Fabian Lopez as Ramiro
 Pedro Rodman as Front Desk Guy
 Isidoro Rojas as Thug
 Luis Raul Alcócer as Manny

References

External links 
 
 

2016 films
2016 action films
Films scored by Larry Groupé
Films set in Mexico
Films shot in Mexico
Mexican action films
English-language Mexican films
2010s English-language films
2010s Mexican films